The 2023 Kansas Jayhawks football team will represent the University of Kansas in the 2023 NCAA Division I FBS football season. It will be the Jayhawks' 134th season. The Jayhawks will play their home games at David Booth Kansas Memorial Stadium in Lawrence, Kansas, and will compete in the Big 12 Conference. They will be led by third-year head coach Lance Leipold. The Jayhawks will enter the season looking to make back-to-back bowl games for the first time since the 2007 and 2008 seasons.

Offseason

Starters lost
Starters are based on starters from the final game of the 2022 season. Players listed below have run out eligibility. In total, the Jayhawks had 4 players run out of eligibility.

Entered NFL Draft

Transfer portal
Incoming

Outgoing
Transfers listed below are only players who announced intention to transfer after the final regular season game of 2022.

Recruiting

Highest rated recruit

|}

Schedule

Coaching staff
Coaching staff is updated as of December 28, 2022. The coaching staff may undergo multiple changes in the offseason.

References

Kansas
Kansas Jayhawks football seasons
Kansas Jayhawks football